In mathematical analysis and its applications, a function of several real variables or real multivariate function is a function with more than one argument, with all arguments being real variables. This concept extends the idea of a function of a real variable to several variables. The "input" variables take real values, while the "output", also called the "value of the function", may be real or complex. However, the study of the complex-valued functions may be easily reduced to the study of the real-valued functions, by considering the real and imaginary parts of the complex function; therefore, unless explicitly specified, only real-valued functions will be considered in this article.

General definition

A real-valued function of  real variables is a function that takes as input  real numbers, commonly represented by the variables , for producing another real number, the value of the function, commonly denoted . For simplicity, in this article a real-valued function of several real variables will be simply called a function. To avoid any ambiguity, the other types of functions that may occur will be explicitly specified.

In other words, a real-valued function of  real variables is a function

such that its domain  is a subset of  that contains a nonempty open set.

An element of  being an -tuple  (usually delimited by parentheses), the general notation for denoting functions would be . The common usage, much older than the general definition of functions between sets, is to not use double parentheses and to simply write .

It is also common to abbreviate the -tuple  by using a notation similar to that for vectors, like boldface , underline , or overarrow . This article will use bold.

A simple example of a function in two variables could be:

which is the volume  of a cone with base area  and height  measured perpendicularly from the base. The domain restricts all variables to be positive since lengths and areas must be positive.

For an example of a function in two variables:

The previous example can be extended easily to higher dimensions:

for  non-zero real constants , which describes a -dimensional hyperplane.

The Euclidean norm:

is also a function of n variables which is everywhere defined, while

For a non-linear example function in two variables:

The function does not include the origin , if it did then  would be ill-defined at that point. Using a 3d Cartesian coordinate system with the xy-plane as the domain , and the z axis the codomain , the image can be visualized as a curved surface.

The function can be evaluated at the point  in :

However, the function couldn't be evaluated at, say

Image

For a continuous (see below for a definition) real-valued function which has a connected domain, the image is either an interval or a single value. In the latter case, the function is a constant function.

The preimage of a given real number  is called a level set. It is the set of the solutions of the equation .

Domain

The domain of a function of several real variables is a subset of  that is sometimes, but not always, explicitly defined.

Conversely, it is sometimes possible to enlarge naturally the domain of a given function, for example by continuity or by analytic continuation.

Moreover, many functions are defined in such a way that it is difficult to specify explicitly their domain. This is equivalent to test whether a polynomial is always positive, and is the object of an active research area (see Positive polynomial).

Algebraic structure

The usual operations of arithmetic on the reals may be extended to real-valued functions of several real variables in the following way: 
 For every real number , the constant function  is everywhere defined.

It follows that the functions of  variables that are everywhere defined and the functions of  variables that are defined in some neighbourhood of a given point both form commutative algebras over the reals (-algebras). This is a prototypical example of a function space.

One may similarly define

This constraint implies that the above two algebras are not fields.

Univariable functions associated with a multivariable function

One can easily obtain a function in one real variable by giving a constant value to all but one of the variables.

Other univariable functions may be defined by restricting  to any line passing through . These are the functions

In next section, we will show that, if the multivariable function is continuous, so are all these univariable functions, but the converse is not necessarily true.

Continuity and limit
Until the second part of 19th century, only continuous functions were considered by mathematicians. At that time, the notion of continuity was elaborated for the functions of one or several real variables a rather long time before the formal definition of a topological space and a continuous map between topological spaces. As continuous functions of several real variables are ubiquitous in mathematics, it is worth to define this notion without reference to the general notion of continuous maps between topological space.

A function  is continuous at a point  which is interior to its domain, if, for every positive real number , there is a positive real number  such that  for all  such that . A function is continuous if it is continuous at every point of its domain.

For an example, consider the function  such that , and is otherwise defined by

Although not continuous, this function has the further property that all the univariate functions obtained by restricting it to a line passing through  are also continuous. In fact, we have

The limit at a point of a real-valued function of several real variables is defined as follows. Let  be a point in topological closure of the domain  of the function . The function,  has a limit  when  tends toward , denoted

if the following condition is satisfied:
For every positive real number , there is a positive real number  such that

for all  in the domain such that

If the limit exists, it is unique. In this case, we have

Symmetry

For example:

Function composition

Suppose the functions

or more compactly , are all defined on a domain . To restate this:

Note the numbers  and  do not need to be equal.

For example, the function

defined everywhere on  can be rewritten by introducing

Function composition can be used to simplify functions, which is useful for carrying out multiple integrals and solving partial differential equations.

Calculus

Elementary calculus is the calculus of real-valued functions of one real variable, and the principal ideas of differentiation and integration of such functions can be extended to functions of more than one real variable; this extension is multivariable calculus.

Partial derivatives

Partial derivatives can be defined with respect to each variable:

Partial derivatives themselves are functions, each of which represents the rate of change of  parallel to one of the  axes at all points in the domain (if the derivatives exist and are continuous—see also below). A first derivative is positive if the function increases along the direction of the relevant axis, negative if it decreases, and zero if there is no increase or decrease. Evaluating a partial derivative at a particular point in the domain gives the rate of change of the function at that point in the direction parallel to a particular axis, a real number.

For real-valued functions of a real variable, its ordinary derivative  is geometrically the gradient of the tangent line to the curve  at all points in the domain. Partial derivatives extend this idea to tangent hyperplanes to a curve.

The second order partial derivatives can be calculated for every pair of variables:

Geometrically, they are related to the local curvature of the function's image at all points in the domain. At any point where the function is well-defined, the function could be increasing along some axes, and/or decreasing along other axes, and/or not increasing or decreasing at all along other axes.

This leads to a variety of possible stationary points: global or local maxima, global or local minima, and saddle points—the multidimensional analogue of inflection points for real functions of one real variable. The Hessian matrix is a matrix of all the second order partial derivatives, which are used to investigate the stationary points of the function, important for mathematical optimization.

In general, partial derivatives of higher order  have the form:

Multivariable differentiability

Assuming an -dimensional analogue of a rectangular Cartesian coordinate system, these partial derivatives can be used to form a vectorial linear differential operator, called the gradient (also known as "nabla" or "del") in this coordinate system:

used extensively in vector calculus, because it is useful for constructing other differential operators and compactly formulating theorems in vector calculus.

where  denotes the dot product.

The differential of a constant is zero:

In arbitrary curvilinear coordinate systems in  dimensions, the explicit expression for the gradient would not be so simple - there would be scale factors in terms of the metric tensor for that coordinate system. For the above case used throughout this article, the metric is just the Kronecker delta and the scale factors are all 1.

Differentiability classes

If all first order partial derivatives evaluated at a point  in the domain:

exist and are continuous for all  in the domain,  has differentiability class . In general, if all order  partial derivatives evaluated at a point :

If  is of differentiability class ,  has continuous partial derivatives of all order and is called smooth. If  is an analytic function and equals its Taylor series about any point in the domain, the notation  denotes this differentiability class.

Multiple integration

Definite integration can be extended to multiple integration over the several real variables with the notation;

where each region  is a subset of or all of the real line:

and their Cartesian product gives the region to integrate over as a single set:

an -dimensional hypervolume. When evaluated, a definite integral is a real number if the integral converges in the region  of integration (the result of a definite integral may diverge to infinity for a given region, in such cases the integral remains ill-defined). The variables are treated as "dummy" or "bound" variables which are substituted for numbers in the process of integration.

The integral of a real-valued function of a real variable  with respect to  has geometric interpretation as the area bounded by the curve  and the -axis.

While bounded hypervolume is a useful insight, the more important idea of definite integrals is that they represent total quantities within space. The more formal notions of hypervolume is the subject of measure theory. Above we used the Lebesgue measure, see Lebesgue integration for more on this topic.

Theorems

With the definitions of multiple integration and partial derivatives, key theorems can be formulated, including the fundamental theorem of calculus in several real variables (namely Stokes' theorem), integration by parts in several real variables, the symmetry of higher partial derivatives and  Taylor's theorem for multivariable functions. Evaluating a mixture of integrals and partial derivatives can be done by using theorem differentiation under the integral sign.

Vector calculus

One can collect a number of functions each of several real variables, say

into an -tuple, or sometimes as a column vector or row vector, respectively:

all treated on the same footing as an -component vector field, and use whichever form is convenient. All the above notations have a common compact notation . The calculus of such vector fields is vector calculus. For more on the treatment of row vectors and column vectors of multivariable functions, see matrix calculus.

Implicit functions

A real-valued implicit function of several real variables is not written in the form "".

is an equation in all the variables. Implicit functions are a more general way to represent functions, since if:

then we can always define:

but the converse is not always possible, i.e. not all implicit functions have an explicit form.

For example, using interval notation, let

Choosing a 3-dimensional (3D) Cartesian coordinate system, this function describes the surface of a 3D ellipsoid centered at the origin  with constant semi-major axes , along the positive x, y and z axes respectively. In the case , we have a sphere of radius  centered at the origin. Other conic section examples which can be described similarly include the hyperboloid and paraboloid, more generally so can any 2D surface in 3D Euclidean space.

For a more sophisticated example:

for non-zero real constants , this function is well-defined for all , but it cannot be solved explicitly for these variables and written as "", "", etc.

The implicit function theorem of more than two real variables deals with the continuity and differentiability of the function, as follows. Let  be a continuous function with continuous first order partial derivatives, and let ϕ evaluated at a point  be zero:

The total differentials of the functions are:

Complex-valued function of several real variables

A complex-valued function of several real variables may be defined by relaxing, in the definition of the real-valued functions, the restriction of the codomain to the real numbers, and allowing complex values.

If  is such a complex valued function, it may be decomposed as

In other words, the study of the complex valued functions reduces easily to the study of the pairs of real valued functions.

This reduction works for the general properties. However, for an explicitly given function, such as:

the computation of the real and the imaginary part may be difficult.

Applications

Multivariable functions of real variables arise inevitably in engineering and physics, because observable physical quantities are real numbers (with associated units and dimensions), and any one physical quantity will generally depend on a number of other quantities.

Examples of real-valued functions of several real variables

Examples in continuum mechanics include the local mass density  of a mass distribution, a scalar field which depends on the spatial position coordinates (here Cartesian to exemplify), and time :

Similarly for electric charge density for electrically charged objects, and numerous other scalar potential fields.

Another example is the velocity field, a vector field, which has components of velocity  that are each multivariable functions of spatial coordinates and time similarly:

Similarly for other physical vector fields such as electric fields and magnetic fields, and vector potential fields.

Another important example is the equation of state in thermodynamics, an equation relating pressure , temperature , and volume  of a fluid, in general it has an implicit form:

The simplest example is the ideal gas law:

where  is the number of moles, constant for a fixed amount of substance, and  the gas constant. Much more complicated equations of state have been empirically derived, but they all have the above implicit form.

Real-valued functions of several real variables appear pervasively in economics. In the underpinnings of consumer theory, utility is expressed as a function of the amounts of various goods consumed, each amount being an argument of the utility function. The result of maximizing utility is a set of demand functions, each expressing the amount demanded of a particular good as a function of the prices of the various goods and of income or wealth. In producer theory, a firm is usually assumed to maximize profit as a function of the quantities of various goods produced and of the quantities of various factors of production employed. The result of the optimization is a set of demand functions for the various factors of production and a set of supply functions for the various products; each of these functions has as its arguments the prices of the goods and of the factors of production.

Examples of complex-valued functions of several real variables

Some "physical quantities" may be actually complex valued - such as complex impedance, complex permittivity, complex permeability, and complex refractive index. These are also functions of real variables, such as frequency or time, as well as temperature.

In two-dimensional fluid mechanics, specifically in the theory of the potential flows used to describe fluid motion in 2d, the complex potential

The real part is the velocity potential and the imaginary part is the stream function.

The spherical harmonics occur in physics and engineering as the solution to Laplace's equation, as well as the eigenfunctions of the z-component angular momentum operator, which are complex-valued functions of real-valued spherical polar angles:

In quantum mechanics, the wavefunction is necessarily complex-valued, but is a function of real spatial coordinates (or momentum components), as well as time :

where each is related by a Fourier transform.

See also
Real coordinate space
Real analysis
Complex analysis
Function of several complex variables
Multivariate interpolation
Scalar fields

References

 
 
 
 
 

Mathematical analysis
Real numbers
Multivariable calculus